Sam Sung is a district (amphoe) of Khon Kaen province, northeastern Thailand.

History
The minor district (king amphoe) was established on 31 March 1994 by splitting five tambons from Kranuan district. The establishment of the new district became effective on 30 April.

On 15 May 2007, all 81 minor districts were upgraded to full districts. On 24 August, the upgrade became official.

Geography
Neighboring districts are (from the southwest clockwise): Mueang Khon Kaen, Nam Phong, and Kranuan of Khon Kaen Province; Chuen Chom and Chiang Yuen of Maha Sarakham province.

Administration
The district is divided into five subdistricts (tambons), which are further subdivided into 34 villages (mubans). The township (thesaban tambon) Sam Sung (เทศบาลตำบลซำสูง) covers tambon Kranuan. There are a further four tambon administrative organizations (TAO).

References

External links
amphoe.com

Sam Sung